Jonathan Franciscovich Guerreiro (born 3 April 1991) is an Australian-Russian ice dancer. Representing Russia with Tiffany Zahorski, he is the 2018 NHK Trophy silver medalist, the 2018 Skate America bronze medalist, and a three-time Russian national medalist (2021 silver; 2018, 2020 bronze).

Earlier in his career, he won medals at two World Junior Championships — bronze in 2009 with Ekaterina Riazanova and silver in 2011 with Ekaterina Pushkash.

Personal life 
Guerreiro was born on 3 April 1991 in Sydney, Australia, to Svetlana Liapina, a former ice dancer for the Soviet Union, and Francisco Guerreiro from Portugal. He grew up in Australia before moving to Moscow with his family in 2005. He holds dual Russian-Australian citizenship.

Early career 
After early partnerships with Australians Kiah Pilz and Rachael Reading, Guerreiro competed on the Russian regional level with Daria Panfilova. He teamed up with Ekaterina Riazanova in the summer of 2006. They competed together for three seasons and won the bronze medal at the 2009 World Junior Championships. They were coached by Elena Kustarova and Svetlana Alexeeva at Blue Bird FSC in Moscow. Shortly after the 2009 Junior Worlds, Riazanova ended the partnership to skate with Ilia Tkachenko.

Partnership with Pushkash

Junior career 
Coaches Irina Zhuk and Alexander Svinin arranged a tryout with Ekaterina Pushkash and they teamed up in May 2009. They finished fifth at the 2009–10 Junior Grand Prix Final and won the bronze medal at the 2010 Russian Junior Championships. At the end of the season, they switched coaches to Natalia Linichuk and Gennadi Karponossov, which required them to move to Aston, Pennsylvania in the United States.

During the 2010–11 season, they finished fourth at the JGP Final. At the 2011 Russian Junior Championships, they won the silver medal and were assigned to the World Junior Championships where they won silver.

Senior career 
Pushkash and Guerreiro moved up to the senior level for the 2011–12 season. Guerreiro fractured his left foot in training in June 2011, causing them to miss a few weeks of training. They competed at two Grand Prix events, 2011 Skate Canada and 2011 Cup of Russia. At the end of the season, they changed coaches to Nikolai Morozov in Moscow.

Prior to the 2013–14 season, Pushkash and Guerreiro began training with Anjelika Krylova and Pasquale Camerlengo in Bloomfield Hills, Michigan. They ended their partnership at the end of the season.

Partnership with Zahorski

2014–15 season 
In 2014, Guerreiro formed a partnership with French ice dancer Tiffany Zahorski, coached by Alexander Zhulin. In July 2014, the Russian Federation asked the French Skating Federation (FFSG) to release her to skate for Russia. They placed fifth at the 2015 Russian Championships.

2015–16 season 
The FFSG released Zahorski in October 2015, three years and nine months after her last competition for France, allowing Zahorski/Guerreiro to appear for Russia internationally. The two made their international debut at the 2015 Santa Claus Cup, winning the gold medal. They finished fifth at the 2016 Russian Championships.

2016–17 season 
In the 2016–17 season, Zahorski/Guerreiro won the bronze medal at the 2016 CS Ondrej Nepela Memorial after placing third in both segments and earning a new personal best total score of 165.64 points. They received another bronze medal in their next event, the 2016 CS Finlandia Trophy. They then made their Grand Prix series debut at the 2016 Rostelecom Cup where they placed fifth. A few weeks later they won their third CS medal of the season, the silver at the 2016 CS Warsaw Cup with a personal best score of 173.02 points.

For the third consecutive year, they finished fifth at the Russian Championships. Zahorski competed in the free dance after developing a fever.

In mid-May 2017 Zahorski/Guerreiro changed coaches to Elena Kustarova and Svetlana Alexeeva

2017–18 season: Pyeongchang Olympics 
Zahorski/Guerreiro started their season by winning the silver medal at the 2017 CS Minsk-Arena Ice Star. Competing on the Grand Prix series, they placed fourth at the 2017 Cup of China and sixth at the 2017 Skate America.

In December 2017 they won the bronze medal at the 2018 Russian Championships. A month later they placed 6th at the 2018 European Championships after placing eighth in the short dance and sixth in the free dance.

It was announced by the Russian Figure Skating Federation on 23 January 2018 that Ivan Bukin was not invited to the 2018 Winter Olympics. Because of this, Zahorski/Guerreiro were sent instead. Zahorski/Guerreiro placed thirteenth at the 2018 Winter Olympics. Later they placed eighth at the 2018 World Championships with a personal best score of 180.42 points.

2018–19 season 
Zahorski suffered from a recurrence of a knee injury over the summer that limited the duo's training time leading up to the new season. Zahorski/Guerreiro started their season at the 2018 Skate America. They ranked third in the rhythm dance and fourth in the free dance, placing third overall. The bronze medal was their first Grand Prix medal. Guerreiro said: "We haven't had this many free dance run-throughs under our belts, so we just kind of prayed and hoped for the best. Overall, it's a good start." In early November Zahorski/Guerreiro competed at their second Grand Prix event of the season, the 2018 NHK Trophy, where they won the silver medal with a personal best score of 183.05 points.

With one Grand Prix silver medal and one bronze medal they qualified for the 2018–19 Grand Prix Final, where they finished fifth.

At the 2019 Russian Championships, Zahorski/Guerreiro placed third in the rhythm dance, several points behind the top two teams but more than three points ahead of fourth-place finishers Sofia Evdokimova / Egor Bazin. The team had major problems in the free dance, with Guerreiro's boot laces coming undone early on, and Zahorski making errors on both her twizzles and the one-foot step sequence.  Consequently, they dropped to seventh place in the free dance and overall, and were not named to the Russian team to the European Championships.

2019–20 season 
Zahorski tore the meniscus in her knee late in the summer, causing the team to lose significant training time.

Zahorski/Guerreiro debuted their programs at the Russian test skates, citing their "Survivor" free dance as having been chosen to differentiate themselves from the prevailing lyrical style of skating. They did not compete a Challenger event, and made their return to the Grand Prix at 2019 Skate America, where they placed fifth. They were fifth as well at the 2019 Internationaux de France.

Competing at the 2020 Russian Championships, Zahorski/Guerreiro placed third in the rhythm dance. Third in the free dance as well, they returned to the national podium as bronze medalists.  Zahorski said "before this competition, we actually got in training. We had a good two and a half weeks of training, so hopefully, going into Europeans, we'll add more and it will be much better." At the 2020 European Championships, they placed fourth in the fifth in the rhythm dance, but dropped to sixth place after the free dance. They had been assigned to compete at the World Championships in Montreal, but these were cancelled as a result of the COVID-19 pandemic.

2020–21 season 
Zahorski contracted a mild case of COVID-19 in the off-season, but the team nevertheless debuted at the senior test skates. They competed in the third stage of the Cup of Russia series in Sochi, beating Khudaiberdieva/Bazin for gold by 4.02 points.

With the Grand Prix assigned based primarily on geographic location, Zahorski/Guerreiro competed at the 2020 Rostelecom Cup, coming second in the short program. They were second in the free dance as well, taking the silver medal.

Two-time defending national champions Sinitsina/Katsalapov sat out the 2021 Russian Championships, making Zahorski/Guerreiro the presumptive silver medalists behind Stepanova/Bukin.  They indeed placed second in both programs, taking another silver medal.  While the 2021 European Championships had already been cancelled due to the pandemic, and assignments for the 2021 World Championships other than the national champions were withheld pending later domestic results.

Following the national championships, Zahorski/Guerreiro participated in the 2021 Channel One Trophy, a televised team competition held in lieu of the cancelled European Championships.  They were selected for the Red Machine team captained by Alina Zagitova. They placed second in both their segments of the competition, while their team finished in first overall. They did not participate in the Russian Cup Final.

2021–22 season 
The team's preparations for the new season were hindered by Guerreiro contracting COVID-19 over the summer. As a result of this, their new free dance was not ready for debut by the Russian test skates, and they performed their rhythm dance twice. They subsequently withdrew from their first Grand Prix assignment, the 2021 Skate America. On October 14, Guerreiro and Zahorski's coach Svetlana Alekseeva told TASS that Zahorski was in an infectious diseases hospital.

Returning to competition for the 2022 Russian Championships, Zahorski/Guerreiro were fourth in the rhythm dance, 4.60 points behind the newcomers Davis/Smolkin, a result which attracted audible boos from audience members in Saint Petersburg. However, they struggled through the free dance, with Zahorski immediately going to the medical room upon leaving the ice, and dropped to eighth position overall. Guerreiro said afterward "we wanted to fight for a spot on the Olympic team and we knew it would be a hard competition. Tiffani skated well in the rhythm dance, but today it was just physically not possible."

Programs

With Zahorski

With Pushkash

With Riazanova

Competitive highlights
GP: Grand Prix; CS: Challenger Series; JGP: Junior Grand Prix

With Zahorski

With Pushkash

With Riazanova

With Pilz

Detailed results 

Small medals for short and free programs awarded only at ISU Championships. At team events, medals awarded for team results only.

With Zahorski

References

External links 

 
 
 
 Ekaterina Riazanova / Jonathan Guerreiro at Tracings.net

Russian male ice dancers
Australian male ice dancers
1991 births
Living people
Figure skaters from Sydney
Australian people of Portuguese descent
Australian people of Russian descent
Russian people of Portuguese descent
World Junior Figure Skating Championships medalists
Australian emigrants to Russia
Naturalised citizens of Russia
Figure skaters at the 2018 Winter Olympics
Olympic figure skaters of Russia https://t.me/jonathan_guerreiro